Steven Paul Bryant (born 5 September 1953) is an English former professional footballer born in Islington, London, who played as a winger or left back.

He made more than 250 appearances in the Football League playing for Birmingham City, Sheffield Wednesday (on loan), Northampton Town (in two spells) and Portsmouth, before moving to Australia, where he played for Canberra City in the National Soccer League. He won Northampton Town's Player of the Year award in 1978.

References

1953 births
Living people
Footballers from Islington (district)
English footballers
Association football wingers
Birmingham City F.C. players
Sheffield Wednesday F.C. players
Northampton Town F.C. players
Portsmouth F.C. players
English Football League players
Canberra City FC players